Dunkeld Cathedral is a Church of Scotland place of worship which stands on the north bank of the River Tay in Dunkeld, Perth and Kinross, Scotland. Built in square-stone style of predominantly grey sandstone, the cathedral proper was begun in 1260 and completed in 1501. It stands on the site of the former Culdee Monastery of Dunkeld, stones from which can be seen as an irregular reddish streak in the eastern gable.

It is not formally a 'cathedral', as the Church of Scotland nowadays has neither cathedrals nor bishops, but it is one of a number of similar former cathedrals which has continued to carry the name.

History

Because of the long construction period, the cathedral shows mixed architecture. Gothic and Norman elements are intermingled throughout the structure. Although partly in ruins, the cathedral is in regular use today and is open to the public.

Relics of Saint Columba, including his bones, were said to have been kept at Dunkeld until the Reformation, at which time they were removed to Ireland. Some believe there are still undiscovered Columban relics buried within the cathedral grounds.

The original monastery at Dunkeld dated from the sixth or early seventh century, founded after an expedition of Saint Columba to the Land of Alba. It was at first a simple collection of wattle huts. During the ninth century Causantín mac Fergusa constructed a more substantial cathedral of reddish sandstone and declared Dunkeld to hold the Primacy (centre) of the faith in Alba.

For reasons not completely understood, the Celtic bell believed to have been used at the monastery is not preserved in the cathedral. Instead, it was used in the Little Dunkeld Church, the parish church of the district of Minor or Lesser Dunkeld. Possibly this was because the later canons regarded Culdeeism as heresy and refused relics or saints of that discipline.

In the 17th century, the Bishopric of Dunkeld became an appendage of the Crown and subsequently descended to the Earls of Fife. Dunkeld Cathedral is today a Crown property, through Historic Environment Scotland, and a scheduled monument.

In 1689 the Battle of Dunkeld was fought around the cathedral between the Jacobite Highland clans loyal to James II and VII – deposed in the Glorious Revolution the previous year – and a government force supporting William III and II, with the latter winning the day.

Parish
Dunkeld Cathedral is still used as the town's Church of Scotland parish church, with services every Sunday (although the congregation uses the smaller "Little Dunkeld" Church during winter months.) The current minister (since 2001) is the Reverend R. Fraser Penny.

The small Chapter House Museum offers a collection of relics from monastic and medieval times, and local history exhibits.

Burials

Alexander Stewart, Earl of Buchan, known as "the Wolf of Badenoch", was buried in the cathedral following his death in 1405, where his tomb, surmounted by his armoured effigy, can still be seen. Other noteworthy burials include:

John Scotus, (1183–1203)
Geoffrey de Liberatione, Bishop of Dunkeld (1236/7–1249)
Richard de Inverkeithing, a chamberlain of King Alexander II of Scotland and Bishop of Dunkeld (1250/2–1272)
William Sinclair, Bishop of Dunkeld (1309–1337)
Michael de Monymusk, Bishop of Dunkeld (1370–1376)
The 1st Earl of Atholl (c. 1440–1512)
Robert Cockburn, Bishop of Dunkeld (1524–1526)
Charles Edward Stuart, Count Roehenstart (1784–1854)

Gallery

See also
Crínán of Dunkeld
Bishop of Dunkeld
List of Church of Scotland parishes
List of cathedrals in Scotland

References

External links

Dunkeld Cathedral
1894 Floor Plan
Engraving of Dunkeld Cathedral in 1693 by John Slezer at National Library of Scotland

Churches completed in 1501
Cathedrals of the Church of Scotland
Category A listed buildings in Perth and Kinross
Listed cathedrals in Scotland
Scheduled Ancient Monuments in Perth and Kinross
Medieval cathedrals in Scotland
Protestant churches converted from Roman Catholicism
Churches in Perth and Kinross
Historic Environment Scotland properties
Tourist attractions in Perth and Kinross
Museums in Perth and Kinross
Religious museums in Scotland
Local museums in Scotland
Renaissance architecture in Scotland
Culdees
1501 establishments in Scotland